The 2018 Boys' Youth European Volleyball Championship was played in Czech Republic and Slovakia from 7 to 15 April 2018. The top six teams qualified for the 2019 U19 World Championship.

Participating teams
 Hosts
 
 
 Qualified through 2018 Boys' U18 Volleyball European Championship Qualification

Pools composition

Preliminary round

Pool I
Venue:  Zlín, Czech Republic

|}

|}

Pool II
Venue:  Púchov, Slovakia

|}

|}

5th–8th classification

5th–8th Semifinals

|}

7th place match

|}

5th place match

|}

Final round

Semifinals

|}

3rd place match

|}

Final

|}

Final standing

Awards
At the conclusion of the tournament, the following players were selected as the tournament dream team.

Most Valuable Player
  Filip John
Best Setter
  Leonardo Ferrato
Best Outside Spikers
  Matouš Drahanovský
  Tommaso Stefani

Best Middle Blockers
  Radek Baláž
  Maximilian Kersting
Best Opposite Spiker
  Filip John
Best Libero
  Ilia Fedorov

References

External links
Official website

Boys' Youth European Volleyball Championship
European Boys' Youth Championship
Volleyball
Volleyball
Volleyball
International volleyball competitions hosted by the Czech Republic
International volleyball competitions hosted by Slovakia
Sport in Zlín
Volleyball European Championship (boys)